Power Factory Featuring C+C Music Factory is a 1992 video game developed by Digital Pictures and published by 
Sony Imagesoft for the Sega CD. The game puts the player in control of editing the music videos for dance-pop group C+C Music Factory on 3 different songs: "Gonna Make You Sweat," "Things That Make You Go Hmmm..." and "Here We Go Let's Rock & Roll.", and takes place in a fictional "music factory". Digital Pictures also released three more games in the same style, the Make My Video series.

External links

1992 video games
Interactive movie video games
Video games based on musicians
Music video games
Sega CD games
Sega CD-only games
Band-centric video games
Full motion video based games
Digital Pictures
Video games developed in the United States